Herman Anton Hagen (1918 – 18 June 2011) was a Norwegian jurist.

He hailed from Molde and was a lawyer by occupation before entering the public sector. He was the chief administrative officer of Harstad, then Sandnes municipality before being hired as the first chief executive officer of the Industrial Development Corporation of Norway in 1968. He remained here until his retirement in 1988. He moved back to Sandnes and lived here in his later life.

He was also a deputy board member of Strukturfinans.

References

1918 births
2011 deaths
People from Molde
People from Sandnes
Norwegian jurists
Norwegian civil servants